Rank comparison chart of officers for armies/land forces of Anglophone states.

Officers

References

Military ranks of Anglophone countries
Military comparisons